Methyl isobutyrate is an organic compound with the formula CH3O2CCH(CH3)2.  This colorless liquid, the methyl ester of isobutyric acid, is used as a solvent.

References

Methyl esters
Isobutyrate esters
Perfume ingredients
Flavors